This is a list of magical terms in Germanic mysticism dealing with various occult practices, traditions, and components of magic within Odinism or Germanic Neopaganism. This list is not intended for topics like stage magic, illusion, or other entertainment-based definition. It is also not for strictly paranormal topics, such as those dealing with UFOs, aliens, ghosts, near-death experiences, ESP, or other such articles. This list should also not include terms not specific to German mysticism.

A
Armanen runes
Armanen
Allsherjargoði
Algiz

B
Black Sun
Blót

E
Erilaz - a skilled Runecaster

Ē
Ēostre

F
Fylgja
Fylfot
Fetch

G
Galdr
Gothi
Galdrabók
Grógaldr

I
Icelandic magical staves

M
Mjölnir

N
Nithing pole

O
Odic force
Odal rune

R
Runes
Runic insignia of the Schutzstaffel
Runic magic
Runology

S
Sowilō

T
Tiwaz rune

U
Uthark theory

V
Völva
Vitki

W
Wyrd

See also
List of occult terms
:Category:Magical terms in Germanic mysticism

External links
Irminsul Aettir glossary
Irminenschaft glossary
Sunnyway Glossary
Galdragildi

 
Germanic mysticism
Wikipedia glossaries using unordered lists